Homotropus elegans is a species of wasp in the family Ichneumonidae. It is found from Europe to Iran.

References 

Diplazontinae
Insects described in 1829